La Chaîne Météo (lit. The Weather Channel) is a French TV channel, broadcasting weather forecasts 24 hours a day.

The channel is similar to the American cable and satellite service The Weather Channel.

You can buy a paid membership to access the channel on their website.

History 
La Chaîne Météo was launched on the first day of summer 1995 at 7:00 a.m. by Jacques-Philippe Broux. The first weather information was presented on air by Alain Goury and Carine Rocchesani.

On 1 October 2008, the Le Figaro group bought the company Météo Consult, which included La Chaîne Météo.

See also 
 The Weather Channel
 Canalsat

References

External links 
  Official site of the channel

Television channels and stations established in 1995
1995 establishments in France
French-language television stations
Television stations in France
Weather television networks